Mohamed Lamine Camara (born 1 January 1986) is a Guinean former footballer.

Career statistics

Club

Notes

References

1986 births
Living people
Sportspeople from Conakry
Guinean footballers
Association football forwards
Championnat National 3 players
Ligue 2 players
Championnat National players
FC Séquence de Dixinn players
RCO Agde players
CS Sedan Ardennes players
FC Libourne players
Guinean expatriate footballers
Guinean expatriate sportspeople in France
Expatriate footballers in France